Niklas Teichgräber (born 7 February 1996) is a German footballer who plays as a left-back for Regionalliga Nord club TSV Havelse.

Career
Teichgräber made his professional debut for TSV Havelse in the 3. Liga on 24 July 2021 against 1. FC Saarbrücken.

References

External links
 
 
 
 

1996 births
Living people
People from Gehrden
Footballers from Lower Saxony
German footballers
Association football goalkeepers
Hannover 96 II players
Hannover 96 players
VfV 06 Hildesheim players
1. FC Germania Egestorf/Langreder players
TSV Havelse players
3. Liga players
Regionalliga players